Qarabağ FK has participated in 14 editions of the club competitions governed by UEFA, the chief authority for football across Europe. These include 4 seasons in the Champions League, 9 seasons in the UEFA Cup and Europa League, two seasons in the Cup Winners' Cup and one season in the Intertoto Cup. Qarabağ has played three times in the Europa League after qualifying via the Champions League. Counting all of the 86 games the side have played in UEFA competitions since their first entry into the Cup Winners' Cup in the 1996–97 season, the team's record stands at 32 wins, 22 draws and 32 defeats. 

The club plays its home matches at Tofiq Bahramov Republican Stadium, an all-seater stadium in Baku. Since the last rebuilding in 2012, it can host 31,200 spectators. The record attendance for Qarabağ in a European match occurred 30 July 2014, in a 2014–15 UEFA Champions League third qualifying round match attended by 32,000 fans against Red Bull Salzburg which ended with a 2–1 win for the Qarabağ. Qarabağ biggest wins is 5–0 against Samtredia in the 2017–18 UEFA Champions League qualification, while the biggest defeats is 0–6 against Copenhagen in the 1998–99 UEFA Cup Winners' Cup and Montpellier in the 1999 UEFA Intertoto Cup. With 67 caps, Rashad Sadygov and Maksim Medvedev has appeared in the most UEFA matches for Qarabağ, while Reynaldo has scored the most goals with 11. Qarabağ has played Metalurg Skopje, Twente and Copenhagen four times, more than any other team.

In 2017, after beating Copenhagen 2–2 (on away goals) in the play-off round of the UEFA Champions League, Qarabağ became the first Azerbaijani club to reach the group stage. They were drawn in Group C alongside Chelsea, Atlético Madrid and Roma, where they managed to obtain two points in six games after two draws and four losses.

Key

 S = Seasons
 P = Played
 W = Games won
 D = Games drawn
 L = Games lost
 F = Goals for
 A = Goals against
 aet = Match determined after extra time
 ag = Match determined by away goals rule
 QF = Quarter-finals
 KO = Knock-out round

 Group = Group stage
 Group 2 = Second group stage
 PO = Play-off round
 R3 = Round 3
 R2 = Round 2
 R1 = Round 1
 Q3 = Third qualification round
 Q2 = Second qualification round
 Q1 = First qualification round
 QR = Qualification round

Matches
The following is a complete list of matches played by Qarabağ in UEFA tournaments. It includes the season, tournament, the stage, the opponent club and the scores in home and away, with Qarabağ's score noted first. It is up to date as of 24 August 2022.

Overall record
Updated as of 27 July 2022

By competition

The following is a list of the all-time statistics from Qarabağ's games in the four UEFA tournaments it has participated in, as well as the overall total. The list contains the tournament, the number of games played (Pld), won (W), drawn (D) and lost (L). The number of goals for (GF), goals against (GA), goal difference (GD) and the percentage of matches won (Win%). The statistics include qualification matches and is up to date as of the 2021–22 season. The statistics also include goals scored during extra time where applicable; in these games, the result given is the result at the end of extra time.

By opponent club nationality
Accurate as of 27 July 2022

By club
The following list details Qarabağ FK's all-time record against clubs they have met three or more times in European competition. The club and its country are given, as well as the number of games played (Pld), won by Qarabağ (W), drawn (D) and lost by Qarabağ (L), goals for Qarabağ (GF), goals against Qarabağ (GA) and Qarabağ 's goal difference (GD). Statistics are correct as of the 2016–17 season and include goals scored during extra time where applicable; in these games, the result given is the result at the end of extra time.

Club Ranking

UEFA coefficient

Correct as of 2 August 2016. The table shows the position of Qarabağ FK (highlighted), based on their UEFA coefficient club ranking, and four clubs, which are closest to Qarabağ FK's position (the two clubs with the higher coefficient and the two with the lower coefficient).

References

Europe
Azerbaijani football clubs in international competitions